The Samarai Islands archipelago, part of the larger Louisiade Archipelago, is located  southeast of mainland New Guinea island, within the nation of Papua New Guinea.

Geography
The archipelago consists of: 4 larger volcanic islands frequently fringed by coral reefs; and 30 smaller coral islands. 

Logea Island, Samarai Island and Sariba Island lie closest to mainland New Guinea, while the Kitai Group lies further east.

The entire archipelago is within the Bwanabwana Rural LLG (Local Level Government), a part of the Samarai-Murua District in Milne Bay Province, southeastern Papua New Guinea. The seat of the Bwanabwana Rural LLG is Samarai, the population center of the Samarai Islands archipelago.

List of islands

 Basilaki Island
 Beika Island
 Bonarua Hili Hili Island
 Buiari Island
 Castori Islets
 Dagadaga Bonarua Island
 Deka Deka Island
 Didigilo Island
 Dinana Island
 Doini Island
 Ebuma Island
 Gado-Gadoa Island
 Galahi Island
 Gesila Island
 Gonabarabara Island
 Grant Island
 Igwali Island
 Ito Island
 Kitai Bai Island
 Kato Katoa Island
 Kitai Bona Bona Island
 Kitai Katu Island
 Kitai Lilivea Island
 Kui Island
 Kwai Ama Island
 Kwato Island
 Lesimano Island
 Logea Island
 Nasariri Island
 Populai Island
 Samarai Island
 Sariba Island
 Sideia Island
 Sripkunui Island
 Tuyam Island
 Wasima Island

History 
Malay and Chinese sailors may have visited the islands before European explorers. The islands most likely first sighted by Europeans in 1606, by Luis Váez de Torres. Louis Antoine de Bougainville named them the Louisiades in 1768 for King Louis XV of France. European stops were also paid by Admiral Bruni d'Entrecasteaux in 1793, and Captain Owen Stanley in 1849.

Climate 
The islands have a moist tropical climate, and are largely covered with tropical moist broadleaf forests.

See also
 Bwanabwana language

References

External links 
 Milne Bay Province Polling list with place names (2007)
 Eusoils.jrc.it: Detailed geology/soils map (1:1.000.000)
 Louisiades.net: Information and advice for yachts and travellers visiting the Louisiades−Samarai Islands

Archipelagoes of Papua New Guinea
.S
.
Geography of Milne Bay Province
Lists of islands of Papua New Guinea
Volcanoes of Papua New Guinea